"Personal Demons" is the second segment of the eighteenth episode from the first season (1985–86) of the television series The Twilight Zone. Martin Balsam plays writer Rockne O'Bannon, who is hounded by diminutive clawed creatures which only he can see. Rockne S. O'Bannon is a real screenwriter, who also wrote this segment. Because it is a part of the twist ending, the screenwriting credit appears at the end of the segment instead of in the opening credits.

Plot
Rockne O'Bannon is a television writer who feels he has fallen into a rut and yearns to have just one more genuinely original idea. He begins seeing mysterious, hooded creatures in his neighborhood. No one else can see them, even though they can perceive the damage the creatures do to Rockne's car and apartment and the establishments he visits. The creatures appear in increasingly greater numbers, and Rockne stops writing because he can no longer concentrate with the creatures constantly hounding him.

One night the creatures break into his apartment. Rockne asks what they want and what it will take to get them to leave him alone. The creatures answer, "Write about us." Rockne sits at his typewriter and begins writing, and as he puts words on paper the creatures vanish one by one.

External links
 
 Postcards from the Zone episode 1.45 Personal Demons

1986 American television episodes
The Twilight Zone (1985 TV series season 1) episodes
Television episodes about demons

fr:L'Imaginaire vivant